Member Ed Koch, who had served for 10 years, was elected Mayor of New York City in 1977.  He resigned December 31, 1977 from the U.S. House to become Mayor.

On February 14, 1978, Republican Assembly member Bill Green beat former Democratic Congresswoman Bella Abzug in a close election, and would continue to represent the district for 15 years.

See also 
 List of special elections to the United States House of Representatives

New York 1978 18
New York 1978 18
1978 18
New York 18
United States House of Representatives 18
United States House of Representatives 1978 18